

Transfers

In

Matches

Competitive

Ukrainian Premier League

Ukrainian Cup

Honours

Scorers

All

League

Cup

League squad
(league appearances and goals listed in brackets)

External links
 Seasons descriptions at the official website

2008-09
Ukrainian football clubs 2008–09 season